Wengenville is a rural locality in the South Burnett Region, Queensland, Australia. In the  Wengenville had a population of 46 people.

Geography
The Maidenwell Bunya Mountain Road, one of three ways to access the Bunya Mountains by road, passes through the locality from east to south.

History 
The locality's name is derived from Wengen Creek, which probably comes from the Waka language (Bujiebara dialect) word wingin, which comes from the local Indigenous culture involving an old woman whose name was Winyirgan. Wengenville was probably named at the suggestion of the daughter-in-law of sawmiller Lars Andersen, when the mill was erected on the site. The mill closed in the 1960s and the township was abandoned shortly after.

Maidenwell Provisional School opened in April 1926. In 1934 a new school building was constructed and was opened as Wengenville State School. It closed on 1961.

In the  Wengenville had a population of 46 people.

See also
 List of tramways in Queensland

References 

South Burnett Region
Localities in Queensland